This is a list of Parks and open spaces in the London Borough of Waltham Forest, which contains the most parks of any government district north of the River Thames.

Ownership and Management

List of Parks and Open Spaces

References